Joseph Freiherr von Schellenberg (born 1735 in Vienna; died 8 September 1801 in Napajedla) was an Austrian infantry commander during the French Revolutionary Wars.

Footnotes

Austrian Empire military leaders of the French Revolutionary Wars
Barons of Austria
1735 births
1801 deaths